The Albert is an Apple II clone, released by Albert Computers, Inc., in 1983. Comparable to the Apple IIe, six models were ultimately produced.

Description 
Albert Computers, Inc. offered a "complete system" for approximately the price of a basic Apple IIe. This included 64k of RAM (192k max), upper and lower case, 256 colors (as opposed to the Apple IIe’s 16 colors), enhanced graphics, Analog RGB support, serial and parallel ports, a graphics digitizer tablet, voice recognition, a software package (including word processor, spreadsheet, data manager, mailing list, word speller), 110/220v AC/DC power, and even an integrated battery backup (option). 

The Albert had an unusual "two-piece design" which the company termed "stereo" styling.

History 

Albert Computers, Inc. was based in Thousand Oaks, California, and modeled its line of Apple clones on the Apple IIe, aiming at home and business consumers. 

The company, which insisted that the Albert was not an Apple clone but rather an improvement, saying, "It’s a next-generation computer with more than a dozen advanced hardware features and software capabilities."

The base model of the Albert was $1,595 while the Apple IIe base price was $1,395 and over $3,000 with the options that came standard with the Albert.

The Albert had marketing which featured an image of Albert Einstein and copy which read: "When you're ready to buy a personal computer, it's easy to see why Albert is smarter than Apple." However, Albert Computers, Inc. quickly ran afoul of Apple Computer, Inc., which sued for copyright infringement.

Models

Specifications

Video display 
 Display modes
 40-column text, 5x7 dot matrix
 80-column text, 5x7 dot matrix, monitor (optional with 128 KB RAM expansion)
 Low-resolution color graphics
 High-resolution color graphics
 RGB and composite monitor outputs

 Text capacity
 24 lines by 40 columns
 24 lines by 80 columns (optional with 128 KB RAM expansion)

 Character set
 96 printable ASCII characters, upper- and lowercase

 Character formatting
 Normal
 Inverse
 Flashing

 Low-resolution graphics
 6 on-screen colors (from 256 selectable colors)
 48 H × 48 V resolution
 48 H × 40 V with 4 lines of text

 High-resolution graphics
 6 on-screen colors (from 256 selectable colors)
 Color-selectable text and background
 280 × 192 px resolution (6 colors)
 140 × 192 px resolution (16 colors)

Processing
 CPU
 1 MHz 6502A 8-bit microprocessor with 16-bit address bus

 Registers
 Accumulator (A)
 Index registers (X, Y)
 Stack pointers (P)

 Register size
 8-bits

 Data bus
 8-bits

 Address bus
 16-bits

 Address range
 65,536 (64K)

Memory
 Standard memory
 64 KB of dynamic RAM
 Expandable on motherboard to 192 KB

 Programmable storage
 64 KB RAM

 Read-only memory
 2 on-board ROM sockets

I/O 
 Detached typewriter-style keyboard
 Microphone input
 8-ohm speaker
 Output speaker jack
 Amplifier with volume control
 Video display output (composite color or programmable RGB)
 RS-232 serial port
 Parallel printer port
 Serial printer port
 RS-432/422 (links to Ethernet via network gateway connector)
 5 expansion slots (fully buffered with interrupt and DMA priority structure)

 Hand control (gaming) I/O signals (16-pin DIP)
 Annunciator outputs: 4
 Strobe: 1
 Switch inputs: 3
 Analog inputs: 4
 Ground and +5 V
 Soft-switched

 Analog-to-digital converter inputs
 Analog inputs: 6 (8)
 Annunciator outputs: 4
 Switch inputs: 3
 Ground and +5 V
 Soft-switched

 Digital-to-analog converter outputs
 8-bit digital/analog converter
 Real-time clock: month, day, hour, minutes, second

Power requirements
 Line
 110 to 220 VAC , or 8 to 32 VDC

 Battery
 12 VDC
 1.2 ampere-hours

(All specifications standard except as indicated.)

References

Further reading 
 Computerworld  (July 11, 1983) "Apple-Compatible System Runs Over 15,000 Packages"
 PC Magazine (April 11, 1989) "Dvorak's Hall of Infamy": The Order of the White Elephant ("Products that were ill-timed or flawed, but somewhat interesting.")

External links 
 Albert Apple II Clone (Time Tech Traveller YouTube channel, June 11, 2022)
 Photo Gallery (VintageComputer.ca)
 Apple2Clones.com 

Apple II clones
Computer-related introductions in 1983
Companies based in Thousand Oaks, California